Camilo Domingos (February 14, 1965 – August 7, 2005) was a Santomean singer of Cape Verdean and Bissauan (now Bissauan Guinean) descent.

Early life
Domingos was born in the settlement of Conceição on the island of Príncipe to a family of three children. Today, the city has a large population of Cape Verdean descendants. His father was Cape Verdean and his mother was Bissauan (now Bissau Guinean or Guinea-Bissauan)

Career
He started his music career in 1973. He made 11 albums, including Badjuda, És Meu Amor, Maninha My Love, Nada a Ver, Sunduro, and Nha Vida é Tchora.   He made Dor de Mundo (Pain of the World) at the end of his career. He took part in several concerts and festivals in Angola, São Tomé and Príncipe, the United States, and Portugal.

He died on August 7, 2005, at the age of 40, of an incurable disease.

Discography
Morena (1991)
Man Le Le (1993)
Nada a Ver (1994)
Dinheiro (1995)
Badjuda
És Meu Amor,
Maninha My Love
Sunduro
Nha Vida é Tchora
Dor de Mundo

References

External links
Camilo Domingos at Discogs

1965 births
2005 deaths
São Tomé and Príncipe musicians
São Tomé and Príncipe people of Cape Verdean descent
20th-century male singers
21st-century male singers
People from Príncipe